Morris Glacier is a glacier in Antarctica,  long, which drains north from Mount Daniel to the Ross Ice Shelf between the Lillie Range and Clark Spur. It was named by the southern party of the New Zealand Geological Survey Antarctic Expedition of 1963–64 for Commander Marion E. Morris, U.S. Navy, Executive Officer (later Commanding Officer) of Squadron VX-6, who piloted the aircraft which flew the party's reconnaissance.

References

Glaciers of Dufek Coast